Mississippi was admitted as a state on December 10, 1817 from the western half of the former Mississippi Territory (the eastern half became Alabama Territory). It elected its first representative to Congress August 4–5, 1817.

See also 
 1816 and 1817 United States House of Representatives elections
 List of United States representatives from Mississippi

References 

1817
Mississippi
United States House of Representatives